Polyporus alveolaris, commonly known as the hexagonal-pored polypore, is a species of fungus in the genus Polyporus. It causes a white rot of dead hardwoods. Found on sticks and decaying logs, its distinguishing features are its yellowish to orange scaly cap, and the hexagonal or diamond-shaped pores. It is widely distributed in North America, and also found in Asia, Australia, and Europe.

Taxonomy
The first scientific description of the fungus was published in 1815 by Augustin Pyramus de Candolle, under the name Merulius alveolaris. A few years later in 1821 it was sanctioned by Elias Magnus Fries as Cantharellus alveolaris. It was transferred to the genus Polyporus in a 1941 publication by Appollinaris Semenovich Bondartsev and Rolf Singer.

The genus name is derived from the Greek meaning "many pores", while the specific epithet alveolaris means "with small pits or hollows".

Description

Fruit bodies sometimes have stems, but they are also found attached directly to the growing surface. The cap surface is dry, covered with silk-like fibrils, and is an orange-yellow or reddish-orange color, which weathers to cream to white. The context is thin (2 mm), tough, and white. Tubes are radially elongated, with the pore walls breaking down in age. The pores are large—compared to other species in this genus—typically 0.5–3 mm wide, angular (diamond-shaped) or hexagonal; the pore surface is a white to buff color. The stipe, if present, is 0.5–2 cm long  by  1.5–5 mm thick, placed either laterally or centrally, and has a white to tan color. The pores extend decurrently on the stipe. The spore deposit is white.

Microscopic features
Spores are narrowly elliptical and smooth, hyaline, with dimensions of 11–14.5  × 4–5 μm. The basidia are club-shaped and four-spored, with dimensions of 28–42 × 7–9 μm.

Similar species
Polyporus craterellus bears a resemblance to P. alveolaris, but the former species has a more prominent stalk and does not have the reddish-orange colors observed in the latter.

Edibility
This mushroom is edible when young. It has been described as "edible but tough," with toughness increasing with age, and not having "all that distinctive of a flavor." Another reference lists the species as inedible.

Habitat and distribution
Polyporus alveolaris is found growing singly or grouped together on branches and twigs of hardwoods, commonly on shagbark hickory in the spring and early summer. It has been reported growing on the dead hardwoods of genera Acer, Castanea, Cornus, Corylus, Crataegus, Erica, Fagus, Fraxinus, Juglans, Magnolia, Morus, Populus, Pyrus, Robinia, Quercus, Syringa, Tilia, and Ulmus.

This species is widely distributed in North America,
and has also been collected in Australia, China, and Europe (Czechoslovakia, Italy and Portugal).

Antifungal compounds
A polypeptide with antifungal properties has been isolated from the fresh fruit bodies of this species. Named alveolarin, it inhibits the growth of the species Botrytis cinerea, Fusarium oxysporum, Mycosphaerella arachidicola, and Physalospora piricola.

References

alveolaris
Edible fungi
Fungi described in 1815
Fungi of Australia
Fungi of China
Fungi of Europe
Fungi of North America